Pascal Laugier (born 16 October 1971) is a French screenwriter and film director.

Career
Laugier is a former assistant to director Christophe Gans, having directed the "making-of" documentary about Gans' 2001 film, Brotherhood of the Wolf (Laugier also starred in the film). He has written and directed the fantasy-horror feature films Saint Ange, Martyrs, and The Tall Man.

Laugier has been associated with the New French Extremity movement.

Laugier was set to direct the remake of Hellraiser but was later taken off the project due to creative differences with the producers; Laugier wanted his film to be very serious and explore gay S&M culture, whereas the producers wanted the film to be more commercial and appeal to a teen audience.

Potential future directing projects include a supernatural thriller entitled Details.

Laugier is also the director of Mylène Farmer's music video "City of Love", the teaser of which was released online in December 2015.

In December 2016, while filming Ghostland, Taylor Hickson was told by director Laugier to bang her fists against a glass window and that it was safe to do so. The window then shattered and she fell on the glass, severely cutting the left side of her face. The wound required 70 stitches, which left her with permanent scarring. Subsequently in 2019, the film’s production company, Incident Productions Inc., "pleaded guilty to failing to ensure the safety and welfare of a worker under the Workplace Safety and Health Act" and was fined $40,000 by the province of Manitoba for the incident.

Filmography
 Saint Ange (2004)
 Martyrs (2008)
 The Tall Man (2012)
 Ghostland (2018)

References

External links

1971 births
French film directors
French male screenwriters
French screenwriters
Horror film directors
Living people